The flag of Central Province, was adopted for the Central Province of Sri Lanka on 14 November 1987.

Symbolism
The Central Province flag, like many of the other provincial flags depicts the image of a yellow lion in the center. It is on a red square background and again bordered by a yellow border. The red square background is on a white flag yet again bordered by a dotted yellow pattern and red and brown stripes. To the left of the lion are the images of the Sun and the Moon, with a face on the Sun and a rabbit on the moon. The flag has the Central Province written on it three times, in Sinhala, at the top and  Tamil and English on the bottom.

See also
 Flag of Sri Lanka
 List of Sri Lankan flags

References

External links
 Central Provincial Council
 Flagspot
 Sri Lanka.Asia

Central Province
Central Province
Central Province
Flags displaying animals